The 2022 Budapest Formula 3 round was a motor racing event held on 30 and 31 July 2022 at the Hungaroring, Mogyoród, Hungary. It was the sixth round of the 2022 FIA Formula 3 Championship, and was held in support of the 2022 Hungarian Grand Prix.

With Caio Collet and Alexander Smolyar winning the Sprint Race and the Feature Race respectively, MP Motorsport became the first team after Prema Racing in 2019 to win both races in a Formula 3 weekend and the first non-Prema team to do so.

Driver changes 
Some driver changes occurred prior to the Budapest round, with current Euroformula Open championship leader Oliver Goethe making his FIA Formula 3 debut for Campos Racing by replacing Hunter Yeany, who is ruled out for the Budapest round due to a broken wrist sustained at the previous round in Spielberg.
For Charouz Racing System, the current Euroformula Open Championship runner-up Christian Mansell will be making his debut in the series by replacing Zdeněk Chovanec, who was competing in the last two rounds for the Czech squad.

Classification

Qualifying
Alexander Smolyar took his first pole position of the season to become the sixth different polesitter at the sixth weekend and he claimed pole position for the first time after 2020 at the same venue. Smolyar qualified ahead of both rookies Zane Maloney and Oliver Bearman.

Sprint race

Feature race 

Notes:
 – Arthur Leclerc and Brad Benavides both received a five-place grid drop due to causing collisions in the Sprint Race with Jak Crawford and Ido Cohen respectively.

Standings after the event 

Drivers' Championship standings

Teams' Championship standings

 Note: Only the top five positions are included for both sets of standings.

See also 
 2022 Hungarian Grand Prix
 2022 Budapest Formula 2 round

Notes

References

External links 
 Official website

|- style="text-align:center"
|width="35%"|Previous race:
|width="30%"|FIA Formula 3 Championship2022 season
|width="40%"|Next race:

Budapest
Budapest Formula 3